Jawan Sikandpur is a town in Aligarh district in the state of Uttar Pradesh.It is located at a distance of 16 kms from Aligarh on Aligarh Moradabad Highway.

Education

Jawan Sikandarpur has only one college Chauhan Indravati Inter College located at the Cummunical Health Centre (CHC), Anupshahar Road.

Notable people
 Nawab Singh Chauhan, member of the 6th Lok Sabha

See also
 Jawan Vajidpur
 Sumera Hydroelectric Power Plant
 Kasimpur Power House

References 

Cities and towns in Aligarh district
Villages in Aligarh district